The 1969 NCAA Division I men's ice hockey tournament was the culmination of the 1968–69 NCAA University Division men's ice hockey season, the 22nd such tournament in NCAA history. It was held between March 13 and 15, 1969, and concluded with Denver defeating Cornell 4-3. Three games were played at the Broadmoor World Arena in Colorado Springs, Colorado while the consolation game was played at the newly-opened Cadet Ice Arena.

This was the first time that the NCAA tournament did not take place entirely at one venue, an event that did not occur again until the tournament expanded to include a play-in game in 1977.

This was the 11th and final time that the Broadmoor World Arena played host to the NCAA tournament. The arena that has held the second most championships is the Dunkin' Donuts Center (previously the Providence Civic Center) with 6 (as of 2016).

Qualifying teams
Four teams qualified for the tournament, two each from the eastern and western regions. The ECAC tournament champion and the two WCHA tournament co-champions received automatic bids into the tournament. An at-large bid was offered to a second eastern team based upon both their ECAC tournament finish as well as their regular season record.

Format
The ECAC champion was seeded as the top eastern team while the WCHA co-champion with the better regular season record was given the top western seed. The second eastern seed was slotted to play the top western seed and vice versa. Both semifinal games and the championship game were played at the Broadmoor World Arena while the consolation match was held at the Cadet Ice Arena. All matches were Single-game eliminations with the semifinal winners advancing to the national championship game and the losers playing in a consolation game.

Bracket

Note: * denotes overtime period(s)

Semifinals

(W1) Denver vs. (E2) Harvard

(E1) Cornell vs. (W2) Michigan Tech

Consolation Game

(E2) Harvard vs. (W2) Michigan Tech

National Championship

(W1) Denver vs. (E1) Cornell

All-Tournament team

First Team
G: Gerry Powers (Denver)
D: Keith Magnuson* (Denver)
D: Bruce Pattison (Cornell)
F: Brian Cornell (Cornell)
F: Tom Miller (Denver)
F: Bob Trembecky (Denver)
* Most Outstanding Player(s)

Second Team
G: Ken Dryden (Cornell)
D: Tim Gould (Denver)
D: Steve Giuliani (Cornell)
F: Al Karlander (Michigan Tech)
F: Ron Mark (Harvard)
F: Peter Tufford (Cornell)

References

Tournament
NCAA Division I men's ice hockey tournament
NCAA University Division Men's Ice Hockey Tournament
NCAA University Division Men's Ice Hockey Tournament
1960s in Colorado Springs, Colorado
Ice hockey competitions in Colorado Springs, Colorado